The Dragon and Saint George is the fifth EP by the melodic hard rock band Ten, released on September 4, 2015. As with the previous two albums, the cover of the EP was illustrated by Gaetano Di Falco. It is the first EP release for the band since 1999's Fear the Force and also the first to be released in 12 inch format.

Track listing
All songs written by Gary Hughes.
 "The Dragon And Saint George" – 5:16
 "Musketeers: Soldiers Of The King" – 4:07
 "Is There Anyone With Sense" – 5:15
 "The Prodigal Saviour" – 4:12
 "Albion Born" - 5:24
 "Good God In Heaven What Hell Is This" - 4:00 (12 inch Picture Disc exclusive)
 "We Can Be As One" (European Exclusive track to Isla De Muerta – 3:28

The tracks "Musketeers: Soldiers Of The King", "The Prodigal Saviour" and "Is There Anyone With Sense" are previously unreleased.

Personnel
Gary Hughes – vocals, guitars, backing vocals
 Dann Rosingana – Lead guitars
 Steve Grocott - Lead guitars
John Halliwell – Rhythm Guitars
Darrel Treece-Birch – keyboards, Programming
Steve Mckenna – Bass guitar
 Max Yates – drums and percussion

Production
Written and produced by Gary Hughes
Mixing and Mastering by Dennis Ward

References

Ten (band) albums
2015 EPs
Saint George and the Dragon